Coutelle is a surname. Notable people with the surname include:

 Catherine Coutelle (born 1945), French politician
 Jean-Marie-Joseph Coutelle (1748–1835), French engineer, scientist, and ballooning pioneer

French-language surnames